Unicanal is a Paraguayan Digital television network owned and operated by Grupo JBB.

Programming

News 

Noticieros Unicanal

 Notciero Unicanal Primera Edición
 Noticiero Unicanal: Segunda Edición
 Noticiero Central Unicanal
 Síntesis Unicanal

Sports 

Unicanal Deportes

 Deporte Visión
 Minuto 91
 Tribuna Caliente

Shows 

 De la Claqueta

Entertainment  
 El Ritmo de la Mañana
 LanPy TV ( Domingos de 16 a 19 Horas )

Interview 

 Causa Justa
 Cara o Cruz
 El Péndulo

Telenovelas

Current 
  Noche y día
  Esperanza mía
  Avenida Brasil

Upcoming 
Telenovelas
  El derecho de nacer
  El hombre del mundo se derrite
  Donde me estas necesitando
  Kara Sevda
  Rey de la ambición
  Amor en la luz de la luna
  El hombre inocente
  Está bien, eso es amor

Children programs
  Mr. Bean: Animated Series (Season 2) (English version)  (children-comedy)
  Regalo de vida (Original title in Vietnamese: Quà tặng cuộc sống) (Spanish version)  (children-drama-fantasy-comedy) 
  Grimm's Fairy Tale Classics (Spanish version) (children-Japanese anime-anthology series)

Former  
  Valientes
  Mis amigos de siempre
  Guapas
  Solamente vos
  Los cuervos
  El rey del ganado (Original title in Portuguese: O Rei do Gado)
  La revancha
   Amores Cruzados
  La sucesora (Original title in Portuguese: A Sucessora)
  Acapulco, cuerpo y alma
  Amarte así
  Carola Casini
  Muchacha italiana viene a casarse
  Mi Gorda Bella
  Patito Feo
  Malparida
  Herederos de una venganza
  Alguien que me quiera
  Sos mi hombre
  Doña Bella
  Rencor apasionado
  Kara Para Aşk

Sports Events

Association Football  
 Paraguayan Primera División
 Paraguayan Segunda División
 Paraguayan Primera División B
 Paraguayan Cuarta División

Basketball  
 Paraguayan Basketball League (One game per week are broadcast live Saturday at 17:00 (K.O 17:15) or 18:00 (K.O 18:15))

Volleyball

Handball

Rugby Union

Futsal

References

External links 
  

Television stations in Paraguay
Television channels and stations established in 1989
Spanish-language television stations